Bongseonsa is a head temple of the Jogye Order of Korean Buddhism.  It stands in Jinjeop-eup, Namyangju, a short distance east of Seoul in Gyeonggi province, South Korea.  It was built by National Preceptor Beobin in 969, under the Goryeo dynasty.  At that time it bore the name "Unaksa."  The current name dates to 1469, when Queen Jeonghui of the Joseon Dynasty changed the temple's name at the time that her husband King Sejo was buried nearby.    The name can be interpreted as "temple of revering the sage."  Thereafter, the temple continued to have a close relationship with the queens of Joseon.

Bongseonsa has been burned down and rebuilt several times, due to the 16th-century Seven Year War, 17th-century Manchu invasions of Korea, and 20th-century Korean War.

See also
Korean Buddhist temples
Religion in South Korea

References

External links
Official site, in Korean
Profile of Joseon-era wall paintings in Bongseonsa

969 establishments
Buildings and structures in Gyeonggi Province
Buddhist temples of the Jogye Order
Buddhist temples in South Korea
Namyangju
10th-century establishments in Korea